Laurence de Hastings, 1st Earl of Pembroke (20 March 131920 August 1348) was a Norman English nobleman and held the titles 1st Earl of Pembroke (4th creation), Baron Abergavenny and Baron Hastings under Edward II of England and Edward III of England.

Family
His father was John Hastings, 2nd Baron Hastings and his mother Juliana Leybourne. He was born at Allesley in Warwickshire and christened at Allesley on the same day. As a great-grandson of William de Valence, 1st Earl of Pembroke, and having inherited through the female line a portion of the estates of the Valence earls, he was created (or recognized as) a new creation of the earl of Pembroke in October 1339.

He married Lady Agnes Mortimer (131725 July 1368), the daughter of Roger de Mortimer, 1st Earl of March with whom he had one son:

John Hastings, 2nd Earl of Pembroke (1347–1375)

Death
He died at Abergavenny Castle in 1348 and is buried in the Priory Church of St Mary, Abergavenny.

References

Further reading
 

|-

1319 births
1348 deaths
01
Anglo-Normans in Wales
Laurence Hastings, 1st Earl of Pembroke
14th-century English people
Barons Hastings
Peers created by Edward III
People from the West Midlands (county)